David Gottlieb (November 14, 1944 – December 6, 2008) was an Israeli mathematician.

Biography 
David Gottlieb was born in Tel Aviv. He received his PhD in 1972 from the Department of Mathematics at Tel Aviv University under the guidance of Saul Abarbanel. He was a professor of applied mathematics at Brown from 1985 until his death.

His research focused on numerical analysis, especially as applied to nonlinear partial differential equations.

He was a member of the National Academy of Sciences and the American Academy of Arts and Sciences.

References

External links 

Saul Abarbanel, Sigal Gottlieb, Jan S. Hesthaven, and Chi-Wang Shu, "David I. Gottlieb", Biographical Memoirs of the National Academy of Sciences (2014)

1944 births
2008 deaths
20th-century Israeli mathematicians
Members of the United States National Academy of Sciences
Academic staff of Tel Aviv University
Tel Aviv University alumni
Brown University faculty